Tai Chung may refer to:

Places
 Taichung, a city located in west-central Taiwan.

Miscellaneous
 Tai Chung FC, a football club in Hong Kong.